The Mind of Mark DeFriest (also known as The Life and Mind of Mark DeFriest) is a documentary film about Mark DeFriest, a man imprisoned by the State of Florida since 1980, who spent 27 of those years in solitary confinement. His original four-year sentence, for taking his father's tools after his death, before they had been released to him by the court, and then fleeing the police, has been repeatedly extended due to numerous escape attempts, seven of which were successful, and because of infractions committed while in prison.

"If I was a rapist or a murderer, they'd let me out," DeFriest says in the film. "But I'm the idiot who made them look like idiots."

Reception
The film won the 2014 Best Documentary Feature award at the Lone Star Film Festival. It has a score of 82% on Metacritic.

References

External links

Press kit (in PDF format)

2014 documentary films
American documentary films
Documentary films about incarceration in the United States
2014 films
Documentary films about mental health
2010s English-language films
2010s American films